Joseph T. Adams House is a historic home located at Georgetown, Sussex County, Delaware.  It was built in 1868, and is a two-story, five bay, shingled frame dwelling in the Greek Revival style.  It has a rear ell, gable roof, and cross-gable dormer.  It features corner columns and an elaborate Italianate style cornice.  In 1957, the house was acquired for the first permanent home for the Georgetown town offices since its establishment in 1791.

Joseph T. Adams (1831-1905) was recorded as working as a clerk on the 1850 and 1860 Census. He was an alderman of the Town of Georgetown from 1873-1876. Ownership of the house passed to his wife, Jane Adams, when he died. When she died in 1914, it passed to their son, William Adams.

The site was added to the National Register of Historic Places in 1998.

References

Houses on the National Register of Historic Places in Delaware
Greek Revival houses in Delaware
Houses completed in 1868
Houses in Georgetown, Delaware
National Register of Historic Places in Sussex County, Delaware
1868 establishments in Delaware